Song of Robin Hood is a 1947 picture book compiled by Anne Malcolmson, arranged musically by Grace Castagnetta and illustrated by Virginia Lee Burton. The book collects 18 ballads about Robin Hood. The book was a recipient of a 1948 Caldecott Honor for its illustrations.

References

1947 children's books
American picture books
Caldecott Honor-winning works
Houghton Mifflin books